Gnamptopelta obsidianator, the bent-shielded besieger wasp, is a species of wasp in the family Ichneumonidae.

Description 
Gnamptopelta obsidianator are large, long wasps. The wasps are around 30–40 millimeters. The body is entirely black, except for the orange/yellow antennae. The wings are black, with a darker black border around them. The abdomen is very long, and resembles a tail.

Explanation of name
Obsidianator: Likely comes for obsidere, meaning "to besiege", "watch over", or "look out for" . The suffix "-nator" means "the one who". The literal translation from the Latin would be "the one who watches over", or besieges.

Habitat 
Forest edges, open fields with flowers.

Behavior 
Adults take nectar from flowers, and also likely drink from sap flows. This seems common among Ichneumons. The wasps like to fly low over the ground, where they are identifiable by the long abdomen and orange antennae. The purpose of this behavior is to facilitate prey capture. They capture caterpillars, mainly those of sphinx moths. The wasps do not fly the prey back to a burrow with prey, but lay eggs on the prey itself. The eggs are laid inside the living bodies of the prey.

Mimicry
Like many stingless wasps, this one is a mimic. It is a mimic of the spider wasp genera Entypus and Anoplius, and the species Pepsis menechma.

Range 
Most of the United States southeast, and southwest to Texas.

References

Ichneumoninae